Uzda District is a second-level administrative subdivision (raion) of Belarus in the Minsk Region.

References

 
Districts of Minsk Region